Eagle Point is an unincorporated community in Maxatawny Township in Berks County, Pennsylvania, United States. Eagle Point is located at the intersection of Eagle Point and Hottenstein Roads.

References

Unincorporated communities in Berks County, Pennsylvania
Unincorporated communities in Pennsylvania